The Forgotten Tales is a compilation album by Blind Guardian. It was published in 1996. "'The Forgotten Tales'" contains several cover versions of popular songs, including "Mr. Sandman", "Surfin' U.S.A.", and "Spread Your Wings" as well as alternate versions of the band's previous works. Remastered and re-released on 15 June 2007, with bonus tracks and videos.

Track listing

Lineup
Hansi Kürsch – vocals, bass
André Olbrich – lead, rhythm and acoustic guitars
Marcus Siepen – guitar
Thomas "Thomen" Stauch – drums

Guest musicians
Mathias Wiesner – effects (tracks 1, 4, 11–13), bass (track 6)
Michael Shüren – piano (track 2)
Piet Sielck – backing vocals (track 2), effects (track 8)
Otto Sidenius – organ (track 5)
Jacob Moth – acoustic guitar (tracks 5, 11)
Billy King – backing vocals (tracks 5–6)
Thomas Hackmann – backing vocals (tracks 5, 10)
Ronnie Atkins – backing vocals (track 5)
Rolf Köhler – lead vocals (track 10), backing vocals (tracks 6, 10)
Kalle Trapp – lead guitars (track 10), lead vocals (track 10), backing vocals (track 10)
Aman Malek – backing vocals (track 10)
Stefan Will – piano (track 6)

Personnel
Ralph Kessler – mastering
Andreas Marschall – cover paintings
Dirk Zumpe – photos
Flemming Rasmussen – recording (tracks 1, 5, 7, 11), mixing and engineering (tracks 1, 5, 11), producing (tracks 1, 5)
Piet Sielck – recording (tracks 2–4, 7–8, 12–13), mixing and producing (tracks 2–4, 7–9, 12–13), engineering (tracks 1–3, 6, 12)
Kalle Trapp – recording, mixing, producing and engineering (tracks 6, 10)
Henrik Vindeby – recording (tracks 4, 7, 8), engineering (tracks 2, 12), assistant engineering (tracks 1, 5, 11)
Blind Guardian – producing (tracks 3–4, 7–9, 12–13)

References

1996 compilation albums
Blind Guardian albums
Albums produced by Flemming Rasmussen
Virgin Records compilation albums